Paramethasone is a fluorinated glucocorticoid with anti-inflammatory and immunosuppressant properties.

References

Further reading 

 
 
 

Glucocorticoids
Organofluorides